Bernard Girard (February 22, 1918 – December 30, 1997) was an American screenwriter, producer and film director.

Life and career
A native of Vallejo, Girard served in the United States Army Air Forces during World War II. He was nominated for an Emmy at the 9th Primetime Emmy Awards for Best Public Service Series (You Are There). Girard died December 30, 1997, at age 79. Girard is survived by his wife, Linda, and three sons.

Selected filmography
 As You Were (1951)
 This Woman Is Dangerous (1952)
 Ride Out for Revenge (1957)
 The Green-Eyed Blonde (1957)
 As Young as We Are (1958)
 The Rebel Set (1959)
 Dead Heat on a Merry-Go-Round (1966)
 The Happiness Cage (1972)
 A Name for Evil (1973)
 Gone with the West (1975)
 The Runaways-We're All Crazy Now (1979) recut as Du-beat-e-o(1984)

References

Bibliography
 Packer, Sharon. Neuroscience in Science Fiction Films. McFarland, 2014.

External links

1918 births
1997 deaths
American film directors
20th-century American screenwriters
United States Army Air Forces personnel of World War II